Callichroma seiunctum is a species of beetle in the family Cerambycidae. It was described by Schmidt in 1924. It is known from Peru.

References

Callichromatini
Beetles described in 1924